Nigerian Association of Chambers of Commerce, Industry, Mines and Agriculture is an organisation for all Nigerian state and related Chambers of Commerce of Nigeria. NACCIMA is an organization whose goal is to further the interests of businesses in the country.

NACCIMA was established in 1960.

References

External links 
 NACCIMA Official Website

Organizations established in 1960
Chambers of commerce